Gypsochares bigoti is a moth of the family Pterophoridae that can be found in France, Portugal and Spain.

The larvae feed on Helichrysum stoechas.

References

Moths described in 1989
Oidaematophorini
Moths of Europe